Gillian Patricia Shephard, Baroness Shephard of Northwold,   (née Watts; born 22 January 1940), is a British Conservative politician who was the Member of Parliament (MP) for South West Norfolk from 1987 to 2005. Shephard served as a Cabinet Minister, and is now Chairman of the Association of Conservative Peers.

Shephard is currently the chair of the Alumni Association of Oxford University. She was the chair of the Council of the Institute of Education until 2015 and deputy commissioner of the Social Mobility and Child Poverty Commission until 2017.

Early life and career
The daughter of Reginald and Bertha Watts, she was born in Cromer, Norfolk, and spent her early years in Mundesley on Sea, her father being a haulier with a small garage. She was educated at North Walsham Girls' High School and St Hilda's College, Oxford, where she graduated with an MA in Modern Languages. 

She became a schoolteacher and then worked as an Education Inspector for Norfolk County Council from 1963 to 1975. From 1975 to 1977 she worked for Anglia Television. She was elected to Parliament in 1987, and became Parliamentary Private Secretary to Peter Lilley in 1988. She was appointed Parliamentary Under-Secretary of State for the Department of Social Security in 1989, and then in 1990, Minister of State at HM Treasury. In 1990, she was given the additional role of Deputy Chairman of the Party.

Family
She married Thomas Shephard on 27 December 1975. She has two stepsons, including econometrician Neil Shephard FBA, Professor of Economics and Statistics at Harvard University.

Ministerial career
After the 1992 general election, she was appointed Secretary of State for Employment, then Minister of Agriculture, Fisheries and Food in 1993. She moved to Secretary of State for Education in 1994, and stayed at the department when the Department for Employment merged into it in 1996. She remained in this position until the 1997 general election.

Shephard was one of two women promoted to John Major's Cabinet in 1992; the other was Virginia Bottomley. The two believed the media was looking for stories of Ministerial "catfights" and made a pact to work together, despite differences in backgrounds and working styles. In an interview, Shephard said, "We said that we would never give anybody the chance to say that we were criticising the other. We would be supportive; end of. And we were."

Shephard provided considerable information regarding her role as Secretary of State for Education in interviews conducted by Brian Sherratt in October 1994 and March 1996 for his book on the agenda for educational reform which the Conservative Party had developed since 1979.

In opposition
After the defeat of the Conservatives, William Hague made her Shadow Leader of the House of Commons and later Shadow Secretary of State for the Environment, Transport and the Regions. She returned to the backbenches in 1999 and stepped down from the House of Commons at the 2005 general election. Her memoirs Shephard's Watch: Illusions of Power in British Politics were published in 2000.

In 2013 following the death of Margaret Thatcher, Shephard published a memoir, The Real Iron Lady, of her time working with the former prime minister.

Life peerage
On 13 May 2005 it was announced that she would be created a life peer, and on 21 June 2005 the peerage was created as Baroness Shephard of Northwold, of Northwold in the County of Norfolk.

She is currently Chairman of the Association of Conservative Peers. She was Deputy Chair of the Social Mobility and Child Poverty Commission until 2017, when she resigned in frustration with Prime Minister Theresa May's lack of action.

Arms

Honours
 She was appointed as a member of the Privy Council of the United Kingdom in 1992, giving her the Honorific Title "The Right Honourable" and after Ennoblement the Post Nominal Letters "PC" for life.
 She was appointed as a Deputy Lieutenant for the County of Norfolk on 23 July 2003, giving her the post nominal letters "DL" for life. on 22 January 2015 She was moved to the Retired List upon reaching the Mandatory retirement age of 75. 
 On 21 June 2005 she was awarded a Life Peerage. The peerage was created as Baroness Shephard of Northwold, of Northwold in the County of Norfolk. This entitled her to a seat in the House of Lords where she sits with the Conservative Party Benches.
 In 2009 she was awarded the Legion of Honour by France.
 She holds Honorary Fellowships from St Hilda's College, Oxford, Queen Mary University of London (2008), and the Royal Veterinary College.
 In July 2018 she was awarded the Honorary degree of Doctor of Civil Law (DCL) from the University of East Anglia.

References

|-

|-

|-

|-

|-

|-

|-

|-

|-

1940 births
Alumni of St Hilda's College, Oxford
Female members of the Parliament of the United Kingdom for English constituencies
British memoirists
British Secretaries of State
British Secretaries of State for Education
British Secretaries of State for Employment
Conservative Party (UK) life peers
Conservative Party (UK) MPs for English constituencies
Deputy Lieutenants of Norfolk
Life peeresses created by Elizabeth II
Female members of the Cabinet of the United Kingdom
Recipients of the Legion of Honour
Living people
Agriculture ministers of the United Kingdom
Members of the Privy Council of the United Kingdom
People from Cromer
UK MPs 1987–1992
UK MPs 1992–1997
UK MPs 1997–2001
UK MPs 2001–2005
People from Northwold
20th-century British women politicians
21st-century British women politicians
British women memoirists
20th-century English women
20th-century English people
21st-century English women
21st-century English people